Rhadinovirus (synonyms: Rhadinoviridae and gamma-2 herpesviruses) is a genus of viruses in the order Herpesvirales, in the family Herpesviridae, in the subfamily Gammaherpesvirinae. Humans and other mammals serve as natural hosts. There are 12 species in this genus. Diseases associated with this genus include: Kaposi's sarcoma, primary effusion lymphoma and multicentric Castleman's disease, caused by Human gammaherpesvirus 8 (HHV-8), also known as Kaposi's sarcoma-associated herpesvirus (KSHV). The term rhadino comes from the Latin fragile, referring to the tendency of the viral genome to break apart when it is isolated.

Species 
The genus consists of the following 12 species:

 Ateline gammaherpesvirus 2
 Ateline gammaherpesvirus 3
 Bovine gammaherpesvirus 4
 Cricetid gammaherpesvirus 2
 Human gammaherpesvirus 8
 Macacine gammaherpesvirus 5
 Macacine gammaherpesvirus 8
 Macacine gammaherpesvirus 11
 Macacine gammaherpesvirus 12
 Murid gammaherpesvirus 4
 Murid gammaherpesvirus 7
 Saimiriine gammaherpesvirus 2

Hosts 
In general, rhadinoviruses infect lymphocytes and adherent cells, such as fibroblasts, epithelial cells, and endothelial cells and once infection occurs, it is, in general, lifelong. Rhadinoviruses infect a wide range of mammals, include humans. Rhadinoviruses have been found in New World monkeys such as the squirrel monkeys (herpesvirus saimiri) and in mice (Murid gammaherpesvirus 68).  More recently, both KSHV-like viruses and a new form of rhadinovirus called rhesus rhadinovirus have been discovered in Old World monkeys. These findings suggest that an additional human tumor virus related to KSHV may be found in humans.

Structure 
Viruses in Rhadinovirus are enveloped, with icosahedral, spherical to pleomorphic, and round geometries, and T=16 symmetry. The diameter is around 150-200 nm. Genomes are linear and non-segmented, around 180kb in length. They are large double-stranded viruses that possess up to 100 genes in a single long chromosome, which is flanked by repetitive DNA sequences called terminal repeats.

Life cycle 
Viral replication is nuclear, and is lysogenic. Entry into the host cell is achieved by attachment of the viral glycoproteins to host receptors, which mediates endocytosis. Replication follows the dsDNA bidirectional replication model. DNA-templated transcription, with some alternative splicing mechanism is the method of transcription. Translation takes place by leaky scanning. The virus exits the host cell by nuclear egress, and  budding. Humans and other mammals serve as natural hosts. Transmission routes are sexual, contact, and through saliva.

Notes 
Rhadinoviruses are unique because they have mastered the ability to pirate cellular genes from their host cells and incorporate them into their genomes. For example, most rhadinoviruses have a copy of the cyclin gene, which regulates the ability of the cell to divide.  These viruses tend to cause tumors when infection occurs outside of their native hosts or in the case of KSHV, in humans when the host is immunosuppressed due to AIDS, old age, or in the setting of organ transplantation.

References

External links 

 Virus Pathogen Database and Analysis Resource (ViPR): Herpesviridae
 Viralzone: Rhadinovirus
 ICTV

Gammaherpesvirinae
Virus genera